ETK may refer to:

 Commune of the Working People of Estonia
 Edakkad railway station, in Kerala, India
 EPH receptor A3
 ETK v News Group Newspapers Ltd, a legal injunction in the United Kingdom